Akmeniai ('stony places', formerly) is a village in Kėdainiai district municipality, in Kaunas County, in central Lithuania. According to the 2011 census, the village had a population of 9 people.

History

During the Soviet era, a part of the village was split and transferred to Jonava District Municipality (Akmeniai, Jonava).

Demography

References

Villages in Kaunas County
Kėdainiai District Municipality